Jazmin Roxy "Jazz" Carlin (born 17 September 1990) is a former British competitive swimmer, who previously represented Wales and the Great Britain swimming team. She competed primarily in endurance freestyle events, and was based at the University of Bath. She won gold for Wales at the 2014 Commonwealth Games, double gold for Great Britain in the 400 metres and 800 metres freestyle at both the 2014 European Championships (long course) and the 2015 European Championships (short course) before winning two silver medals for Great Britain in the same events behind Katie Ledecky  at the 2016 Summer Olympics.

Career
Carlin was born in Swindon, Wiltshire, England. She moved to Swansea, Wales, with her parents (both of whom have Welsh heritage) in 2006, to train at the Wales National Pool. In her international debut at the European Short Course Swimming Championships 2005 in Trieste, Italy, Carlin failed to qualify past the heats of the 200 and 400-metre freestyle. At the 2006 Commonwealth Games in Melbourne, Australia, competing for Wales, she finished eighth in the 800-metre freestyle and finished third in the heats of the 400-metre freestyle. Together with Bethan Coole, Julie Gould and Cari-Fflur Davies she finished sixth in the 4 × 200 m freestyle relay. At the 2008 European Short Course Swimming Championships in Rijeka, Croatia, Carlin was eliminated in the heats of the 200 and 400 metre freestyle. At the 2009 World Aquatics Championships in Rome, Italy, Carlin, along with Joanne Jackson, Caitlin McClatchey and Rebecca Adlington won the bronze medal in the 4x200-metre freestyle relay with a time of 7:45.51, a European record.
At the 2010 Commonwealth Games, Carlin won a silver medal in the women's 200-metre freestyle and a bronze medal in the women's 400-metre freestyle.

In November 2010, Carlin was announced as one of the six nominees of the BBC Cymru Wales Sports Personality of the Year 2010.

In the 2014 Commonwealth Games in Glasgow, Carlin won a gold medal in the 800-metre freestyle and a silver in the 400-metre freestyle. She was the first Welsh female swimmer to win a Commonwealth title since Pat Beavan at the 1974 Commonwealth Games.

At the 2016 Olympics in Rio, she won a silver medal in the 400 metres freestyle and the 800 metres freestyle.

In 2018, Carlin started Open Water Swimming competing in the European Open Water Championships in Loch Lomond.

Outside of competition, Carlin is a qualified personal trainer.

In February 2019, Carlin announced her retirement from competitive swimming, at the age of 28.

Personal bests

See also
 List of European records in swimming
 List of World Aquatics Championships medalists in swimming (women)
 List of Commonwealth Games medallists in swimming (women)

References

External links
 British Swimming profile for Jazmin Carlin
 2006 Commonwealth Games bio
 

1990 births
Living people
Commonwealth Games gold medallists for Wales
Commonwealth Games silver medallists for Wales
Commonwealth Games bronze medallists for Wales
British female freestyle swimmers
Sportspeople from Swindon
Sportspeople from Swansea
Swimmers at the 2006 Commonwealth Games
Swimmers at the 2010 Commonwealth Games
Swimmers at the 2014 Commonwealth Games
Swimmers at the 2018 Commonwealth Games
World Aquatics Championships medalists in swimming
Welsh female swimmers
European Aquatics Championships medalists in swimming
Swimmers at the 2016 Summer Olympics
Olympic silver medallists for Great Britain
Medalists at the 2016 Summer Olympics
Olympic swimmers of Great Britain
Olympic silver medalists in swimming
Commonwealth Games medallists in swimming
Welsh Olympic medallists
Team Bath swimmers
Medallists at the 2010 Commonwealth Games
Medallists at the 2014 Commonwealth Games